A rosette is a round, stylized flower design.

Origin
The rosette derives from the natural shape of the botanical rosette, formed by leaves radiating out from the stem of a plant and visible even after the flowers have withered.

History 
The rosette design is used extensively in sculptural objects from antiquity, appearing in Mesopotamia, and in funeral steles' decoration in Ancient Greece. The rosette was another important symbol of Ishtar which had originally belonged to Inanna along with the Star of Ishtar.

It was adopted later in Romaneseque and Renaissance architecture, and also common in the art of Central Asia, spreading as far as India where it is used as a decorative motif in Greco-Buddhist art.

Ancient origins
One of the earliest appearances of the rosette in ancient art is in early fourth millennium BC Egypt. Another early Mediterranean occurrence of the rosette design derives from Minoan Crete; Among other places,  the design appears on the Phaistos Disc, recovered from the eponymous archaeological site in southern Crete.

Modern use
The formalised flower motif is often carved in stone or wood to create decorative ornaments for architecture and furniture, and in metalworking, jewelry design and the applied arts to form a decorative border or at the intersection of two materials.

Rosette decorations have been used for formal military awards. They also appear in modern, civilian clothes, and are often worn prominently in political or sporting events. Rosettes sometimes decorate musical instruments, such as around the perimeter of sound holes of guitars.

Gallery

See also
Six petal rosette

Footnotes

Ornaments (architecture)
Decorative arts
Ornaments
Visual motifs